El Condor Airport  was an airstrip  northeast of Yacuíba in the Tarija Department of Bolivia.

Current published imagery from Bing, Google, and HERE/Nokia show plowed crop fields crossing the faint remains of the runway.

See also

Transport in Bolivia
List of airports in Bolivia

References

External links
OpenStreetMap - El Condor Airport

Defunct airports
Airports in Tarija Department